Mainstream Records was an American record company and independent record label founded by producer Bob Shad in 1964.

Mainstream's early releases were reissues from Commodore Records. Its catalogue grew to include Bob Brookmeyer, Maynard Ferguson, Jim Hall, Helen Merrill, Carmen McRae, Jimmy Raney, Zoot Sims, Clark Terry, and Sarah Vaughan. Janis Joplin, with Big Brother and the Holding Company, first appeared on Mainstream.

In 1978, Mainstream ceased activities. Bob Shad died in 1985. In 1990, the label was restarted by his daughter, Tamara, and Humphrey Walwyn, the former head of BBC Records. It was bought by Legacy Recordings in 1993 and purchased back by the Shad family in the early 2000s. The label is now run by Shad's granddaughter Mia Apatow, with the help of her brother Judd Apatow.

Discography

56000/S6000 series (12" LPs)
The Mainstream 56000/S6000 Series commenced in 1964 when the label was established by Bob Shad and ran until 1971 and initially reissued material from Commodore Records and Time Records (an earlier Bob Shad label) in addition to some new jazz recordings, then soundtracks, before branching into psychedelic rock around 1966.

300 series (12" LPs)
The Mainstream 300 Series commenced in 1971 as the label focussed more on funk/soul and jazz artists (as well as reissuing jazz LP's originally released on Time Records) before the label folded around 1976.

References

American record labels
Jazz record labels
 
 
Reissue record labels